Pasteur Peninsula is a broad peninsula  long in a north-south direction and ranging from  wide between Guyou Bay and Bouquet Bay, forming the north end of Brabant Island in the Palmer Archipelago of Antarctica. Its interior is occupied by the northern part of Stribog Mountains drained by Oshane, Podayva, Burevestnik and Lister Glaciers.

The peninsula was mapped by the French Antarctic Expedition, 1903–05, and named by its leader Jean-Baptiste Charcot in honour of Louis Pasteur.

Maps
 Antarctic Digital Database (ADD). Scale 1:250000 topographic map of Antarctica. Scientific Committee on Antarctic Research (SCAR). Since 1993, regularly upgraded and updated.
British Antarctic Territory. Scale 1:200000 topographic map. DOS 610 Series, Sheet W 64 62. Directorate of Overseas Surveys, Tolworth, UK, 1980.
Brabant Island to Argentine Islands. Scale 1:250000 topographic map. British Antarctic Survey, 2008.

References

See also 
 List of things named after Louis Pasteur

Peninsulas of Graham Land
Landforms of the Palmer Archipelago
Brabant Island